Mark Sanchez is an American makeup artist. He was nominated at the 68th Academy Awards for Best Makeup. He was nominated for the film My Family, Mi Familia, which he shared the nomination with Ken Diaz.

He also was nominated for an Emmy Award for the makeup on That '70s Show. He did win a Daytime Emmy for The Joan Rivers Show.

References

External links

Living people
Place of birth missing (living people)
Year of birth missing (living people)
American make-up artists